Married to a Lie  is a Finnish television miniseries (4 x 45 min.) produced by Vertigo Production in 2008.

Married to a Lie received the award for Best Miniseries of 2009 at the Venla Finnish Television Awards gala 2010.

Plot
Sonja (Laura Birn) is about to marry Kim (Mikko Nousiainen). In the middle of the wedding preparations, Kim is suddenly taken ill, Sonja sets off to drive him to the hospital, is involved in a car crash, and Kim dies in the hospital. After she recovers from the worst trauma, Sonja starts to sort out the practicalities connected to Kim’s death. It transpires that Kim had been lying to her about his entire life. The successful businessman turns out to be an unemployed idler, who, to top it all, was going to leave Sonja just before the wedding. The man Sonja was marrying did not exist. Sonja starts to probe into Kim’s hidden past, as it has been her past also. It is the only way for Sonja to survive her loss.

External links
 IMDb: Married to a Lie
 Vertigo Production YouTube Channel

Finnish drama television series